Barbara J. Stoll is an American pediatrician and professor. She is the H. Wayne Hightower Distinguished Professor in the Medical Sciences, Professor of Pediatrics and former Dean at the University of Texas Health Science Center at Houston.

Early life and education 
Stoll grew up in New York City. She graduated from Bronx High School of Science. She completed her Bachelor of Arts from Barnard College. Stoll earned a M.D. from Yale School of Medicine, graduating cum laude. She completed a pediatric internship and residency at Babies Hospital and a fellowship in neonatology at Emory University School of Medicine.

Career 
After her fellowship, Stoll was an associate scientist at the International Centre for Diarrhoeal Disease Research, Bangladesh. She was a visiting scientist at University of Gothenburg where she researched systemic and mucosal immune response to diarrheal agents. In 1984, Stoll became an assistant professor in the Uniformed Services University of the Health Sciences Department of Medicine. She researched immune mechanisms of infectious disease prevention. In 1986, she began at the division of neonatal-perinatal medicine at Emory University School of Medicine. She took a year sabbatical working for the World Health Organization where she raised awareness on neonatal morbidity and mortality in developing countries. In 1997, she was promoted to full professor of pediatrics at Emory. In 1999, she was named the vice-chair for research in the department of pediatrics. In 2004, she became the chair of the department. She was the second woman to chair a department at Emory, following Luella Klein, and the first woman to chair Emory's Department of Pediatrics. , she is the H. Wayne Hightower Distinguished Professor in the Medical Sciences, Professor of Pediatrics and former Dean at the University of Texas Health Science Center at Houston.

Personal life 
Stoll met Roger I. Glass when she was 19 years old. They married while she was in medical school. They have three children, Nina, Michael, and Andy Glass.

Awards and honors 
Stoll is a fellow of the American Academy of Pediatrics. In 1986, she was elected member of the Society for Pediatric Research. In 1998 she was elected to the Infectious Diseases Society of America and the American Pediatric Society. In 2009, she was elected to the Institute Of Medicine. She served as president of the American Pediatric Society. In 2016, she received the John Howland Award.

References 

Living people
Year of birth missing (living people)
The Bronx High School of Science alumni
Barnard College alumni
Yale School of Medicine alumni
Uniformed Services University of the Health Sciences faculty
Emory University School of Medicine faculty
University of Texas Health Science Center at Houston faculty
20th-century American physicians
21st-century American physicians
American pediatricians
Women pediatricians
20th-century American women physicians
21st-century American women physicians
20th-century American women scientists
21st-century American women scientists
20th-century American scientists
21st-century American scientists
Members of the National Academy of Medicine
Presidents of the American Pediatric Society
American women academics